The following notable lakes are completely or partially within the borders of the nation of Israel:
Sea of Galilee
Hula Valley
Dead Sea*
Rishon LeZion lake
Dalton lake
Qaraoun lake
Zohar lake
Agam lake
Ayanot lake
Darom lake
Yesodot lake
Netser Hazani lake
Mahoz marsh
Note: the dead sea is known more as the third Israeli sea for its salty water.

See also
 

Israel
Lakes